Sowriyur is a village in Salem district, Tamil Nadu, India. It is famous for cloth manufacturing and silk sarees. There are lot of temples of God Vinayagar, Murugar, Nagalingeshwarar, Vishnu and Mariamman. The famous Festival of God Sri Muthumariamman temple celebration in the month of march every year is well-known by the surrounding places. 

Villages in Salem district